Plumley is a surname. Notable people with the surname include:

 Basil L. Plumley (1920–2012), American soldier
 Charles Albert Plumley (1875–1964), American lawyer and politician
 Fee Plumley, British artist and technologist
 Frank Plumley (1844–1924), American politician and lawyer
 Gary Plumley (* 1956), British footballer
 Gavin Plumley (* 1981), British writer and broadcaster
 Jack Plumley (1910 – 1999), British Anglican priest, Egyptologist and academic

See also
Plumlee, surname